Amadou Harouna (born 25 March 1994) is a Nigerien football defender who plays for Nigelec.

References

1994 births
Living people
Nigerien footballers
Niger international footballers
ASN Nigelec players
Association football defenders